Nils Kristen Sandtrøen  (born 2 February 1989) is a Norwegian politician. 
He was elected representative to the Storting from the constituency of Hedmark for the period 2017–2021 for the Labour Party, and was re-elected for the period 2021–2025.

Personal life
Sandtrøen was born in Tynset on 2 February 1989. He is a brother of Per Martin Sandtrøen.

References

1989 births
Living people
Labour Party (Norway) politicians
Members of the Storting
Hedmark politicians
21st-century Norwegian politicians